Paul Burke (born 1 May 1973), educated at Epsom College in Surrey, is an Irish rugby union player who played at Fly Half.  He has formerly played for Cork Constitution, London Irish, Munster, Bristol, Cardiff and Harlequins. He signed for English club Leicester Tigers for the 2006–7 season and helped take the team to three finals in that year.  The 2007–2008 season was plagued by injury and he retired at the end of that season.  He has since become kicking coach for Leicester Tigers.

References

External links
Leicester profile
Premiership profile
Sporting Heroes
Career Stats@Statbunker 

1973 births
Living people
Bristol Bears players
Cork Constitution players
Harlequin F.C. players
Ireland international rugby union players
Irish Exiles rugby union players
English rugby union players
English people of Irish descent
Irish rugby union coaches
Leicester Tigers players
London Irish players
Loughborough Students RUFC players
Munster Rugby players
People educated at Epsom College
Rugby union fly-halves
Rugby union players from Paddington